Moonlee Records is an independent record label established and run since 2004 by music enthusiasts from Ljubljana, Slovenia and Zagreb, Croatia, members of bands Analena and Lunar. Its official headquarters are located in Ljubljana with a branch office in Croatia. The name of the label is a wordplay, deriving from its central mascot, Mr. Moonlee, which is portrayed as a martial artist lemon.

Bands gathered under Moonlee Records are predominantly coming from ex-Yugoslav area – Slovenia, Croatia, Serbia, Bosnia & Herzegovina and North Macedonia. They range from atmospheric instrumental post rock, screamo and high endurance rock. Some of the bands that Moonlee Records promotes are Analena, Bernays Propaganda, Debeli Precjednik / Fat Prezident, Damir Avdić, Repetitor, In-Sane, Xaxaxa, Psycho-Path, Vuneny and Don't Mess With Texas. Once a year the record label organises the promotional Moonleejada Festival with an intense programme by its house bands.

Moonlee Records operates according to DIY principles and Moonlee Records staff gained experience playing in various bands.

It is considered one of the most important and influential independent record labels from this part of Europe.

Artists 
 Analena
 Bernays Propaganda
 Bilk
 Chang Ffos
 Cog
 Cripple and Casino
 Damir Avdić
 Debeli precjednik / Fat Prezident
 Don't Mess With Texas
 Etreat
 Hesus Attor
 Hitch
 Iamdisease
 In-Sane
 Kleemar
 Lunar
 Nikki Louder
 Psycho-Path
 Repetitor
 Senata Fox
 Storms
 TRUS!
 Vuneny
 Vlasta Popić
 Xaxaxa

Releases* 

* all the release are also available for download on Bandcamp

Resources

External links 
Official web page

Slovenian independent record labels
Record labels established in 2004